is a railway station  located in the town of Tsuruta, Aomori Prefecture Japan, operated by the East Japan Railway Company (JR East).

Lines

Station layout
Mutsu-Tsuruda Station has a single island platform; however, one track is not used, making it effectively a side platform station serving bi-directional traffic. The station building is staffed during normal daytime hours.

Route bus
Kōnan Bus
For Goshogawara Station

History
Mutsu-Tsuruda Station was opened on September 25, 1918 as a station on the Mutsu Railway. It became a station on the Japan National Railways (JNR) when the Mutsu Railway was nationalized on June 1, 1927. With the privatization of the JNR on April 1, 1987, it came under the operational control of JR East.

Passenger statistics
In fiscal 2016, the station was used by an average of 195 passengers daily (boarding passengers only).

Surrounding area

Tsuruta Town Hall
Tsuruta Post office
Tsuruta High School

See also
 List of Railway Stations in Japan

References

External links

  

Stations of East Japan Railway Company
Railway stations in Aomori Prefecture
Gonō Line
Tsuruta, Aomori
Railway stations in Japan opened in 1918